Malabika Sarker (born 14 July 1964) is a Bangladeshi physician and public health scientist who is Director of Research at the BRAC University School of Public Health. She is Associate Dean and Director of the Centre of Excellence for Science of Implementation and Scale-Up.

Early life and education 
Sarker trained in medicine at the Chittagong University of Engineering & Technology. After completing her medical training, she joined the Marie Stopes Clinical Society. She moved to the Karolinska Institute in Sweden, where she completed a certificate in Gender and International Health. Sarker worked toward a master of public health at Harvard T.H. Chan School of Public Health. After securing her master's diploma Sarker returned to Europe, where she completed her doctoral research at Heidelberg University. Her doctorate looked at women in Burkina Faso's awareness of HIV.

Research and career 
In 2011, Sarker was made professor and director at the BRAC University School of Public Health. Her research considers implementation research and systematic strategies to reform public health programs. She pioneered novel community-based approaches to health care, including developing educational campaigns that seek to change understanding about child marriage. She launched campaigns to improve women's health, including a maternity waiting area for at-risk pregnant women from rural villages, and advocating for women public health scientists.

Sarker was made Principal Investigator for Bangladesh in the Johns Hopkins University STRIPE program (Synthesis and Translation of Research and Innovation from Polio Eradication), a global health initiative that seeks to eradicate polio. In 2018, she was elected Heroine of Health by GE Healthcare and Women in Global Health.

Selected publications

References 

Living people
Academic staff of BRAC University
1964 births
Harvard School of Public Health alumni
Heidelberg University alumni